The Parkside Football club is an Australian rules football club located 8 km north east of  Melbourne in the suburb of Alphington. The club's home matches are at Pitcher Park in Alphington.

The Parkside Football Club was founded in 1934 and affiliated with the Victorian Amateur Football Association and remained with the Association until 2002.

Season 2003 the club affiliated with the Northern Football League.

Parkside has won twelve premierships, the last in 2009.

2007 Northern Football League Division Three Grand Final Parkside 16.06.102 defeated Preston 10.18. 66

2008 Northern Football League Division Three Grand Final Parkside 14.09.93 defeated Banyule 03.18. 24

2009 Northern Football League Division Three Grand Final Parkside 12.09.81 defeated Hurstbridge  08.17. 65

2010 Northern Football League Division Three Grand Final Parkside 02.07.19 lost to Hurstbridge   07.10. 52

2011 Northern Football League Division Three Grand Final Parkside 11.13.79 lost to South Morang  15.12.102..  

In 2018 Parkside Were Defeated By North Brunswick 15.11.101 to 9.11.65 in the Division 4 Grand Final and will play in Division 3 In 2019

The club is rich in history and tradition. The club's most famous VFL/AFL player Ray Gabelich played with Collingwood in the Victorian Football League during the 1950s and 1960s.

Club history

A group of mates were having a beer at the Alphington Hotel. Amongst the group was a Mr Lionel Pepper who at the time raised the submission that the group consider the possibility of forming a football Club.

Agreeing with Mr Pepper's suggestion was a Mr Les Hanger, who subsequently called for a meeting to be held to determine the level of support and commitment towards this idea.

An Invitation was posted among the Fairfield and Alphington areas inviting all interested parties wishing to assist in the formation of a new football club to attend.

It was to be held at the home of Mr Reg Watson in Gillies Street Fairfield on 19 January at 6pm.

The meeting was attended by 14 people and they included:

Mr Frank Aston, Mr Maurice Isaacs, Mr Horry Girdwood, Mr Stan Panther, Mr Jack Reynolds, Mr Jack Smythe, Mr Reg Watson, Mr Charlie Laxton, Mr Frank Mariner, Mr Les Hanger, Mr Lionel Pepper, Mr Willis Stuchberry, Mr Harry Smith and Mr Jack Woods.

The first item on the agenda was to determine if there was enough commitment and passion amongst the group to found a club. With overwhelming support amongst all attendees, the meeting then focused on forming an identity, establishing a structure and locating a playing venue.

The following outcomes were then decided:

The playing venue to be sought after would be Pitcher Park, as this ground had no clu linked to it.
The first president would be Mr Les Triggert. The football club would be called 'Parkside'. The name chosen because Pitcher Park was located centrally in the Alphington Parklands (which extended to Bell Street).
The club colors would be red and white. The original Parkside jumper was all red with a white collar and cuffs.
No logo was presented and the club was to be known only as 'Parkside Football Club'.
The first coach, Mr Charlie Laxton was appointed.
The first captain, Mr Reg Watson was appointed.
This meeting on 19 January 1934 had formed a structure and foundation which was the birth of the Parkside Football Club.

The next objective was to find a competition to play in. The Victorian Amateur Football Association (VAFA) was the preferred option but the VAFA was an extremely difficult competition to break into.

It was decided by late February that the club would be represented in the Church's Football League in which it competed from 1934 to 1937.

The PFC logo was introduced to the jumper in 1935.

In 1936 Parkside won its first Premiership.

In 1938 the club was accepted into the VAFA.

Following the disbandment of the committee due to the 2nd World War, Mr Charlie Laxton, Mr Frank Jones, Mr Ray Palling and Mr Harry Smith ensured that Parkside would continue to compete through this era.

The next Parkside Football Club committee was formed in 1945 with Mr Lionel Pepper elected president.

Parkside Football Club's first Senior Grade Premiership in the VAFA was won in 1954, the score was Parkside 15.19.109 defeating Old Xaverians 8.12.60. This side was also a Champion team, going undefeated for the entire season.

In 1959, Parkside became known as 'The Devils', a name introduced by Brian Lauder.

Parkside has won Premierships in the Senior Grade competition of the VAFA in 1954, 1963, 1972, 1982 & 1988.

In 1988 an historical achievement was realised with the Parkside Football Club receiving promotion to 'A' Grade in the VAFA.

2002 marked the end of a 65 years of participation in the VAFA, as the club joined the Diamond Valley Football League (DVFL) for the 2003 season.

The DVFL was re-branded for the 2007 season, with a new competition formed called The Northern Football League (NFL).

Rich in history and tradition, priding on its values and culture, 2008 sees us all celebrate 75 Years of the Parkside Football Club.

In 2018 Parkside FC played Box Hill North in Round 1 for The Ryder Cup.

References

External links
 Footypedia
 Northern Football League website
 Parkside Football Club Website

Northern Football League (Australia) clubs
Australian rules football clubs established in 1934
1934 establishments in Australia
Australian rules football clubs in Melbourne
Sport in the City of Darebin